State Route 106 (SR 106) is a Washington state highway in Mason County, extending  from  (US 101) in Skokomish to  south of Belfair. PSH 21 became SR 106 in 1964 and since, the Washington State Department of Transportation has arranged and completed minor projects to improve the roadway.

Route description

From the intersection, the road travels southeast to bridge Skobob Creek and curve north along the Skokomish River and Annas Bay to the community of Union. The roadway approaching the SR 3 intersection near Belfair was used by 6,100 motorists daily in 2007 based on average annual daily traffic (AADT) data collected by the Washington State Department of Transportation; AADT data from 1970 shows that 2,000 motorists used the same section of SR 106 daily.

History

The first state-maintained highway on the current route of SR 106 was State Road 21, established in 1915 by the Washington State Legislature and Department of Highways and ran from Skokomish to Kingston. State Road 21 later became State Road 14, named the Navy Yard Highway, in a 1923 renumbering. During the creation of the Primary and secondary highways, State Road 14 became  (PSH 14) in 1937.

Recently, the Washington State Department of Transportation (WSDOT) has arranged and completed some minor construction projects along the SR 106 corridor. In 2007, WSDOT installed a traffic signal at the SR 106 / SR 3 intersection south of Belfair.

Major intersections

References

External links

Highways of Washington State

106
Transportation in Mason County, Washington